Plateau Penutian (also Shahapwailutan, Lepitan) is a family of languages spoken in northern California, reaching through central-western Oregon to northern Washington and central-northern Idaho.

Family division
Plateau Penutian consists of four languages:

History
Plateau Penutian as originally proposed was one branch of the hypothetical Penutian phylum as proposed by Edward Sapir. The original proposal also included Cayuse (which was grouped with Molala into a Waiilatpuan branch); however, this language has little documentation and that which is documented is inadequately recorded. Thus, the status of Cayuse within Penutian (or any other genealogical relation for that matter) may very well forever remain unclassified.

The Sahaptian grouping of Sahaptin and Nez Percé has long been uncontroversial. Several linguists have published mounting evidence in support of a connection between Klamath (a.k.a. Klamath-Modoc) and Sahaptian. Howard Berman provides rather convincing evidence to include Molala within Plateau Penutian. Recent appraisals of the Penutian hypothesis find Plateau Penutian to be "well supported" by specialists (DeLancey & Golla (1997: 181); Campbell 1997), with DeLancey & Golla (1997: 180) cautiously stating "while all subgroupings at this stage of Penutian research must be considered provisional, several linkages show considerable promise" (Campbell 1997 likewise mentions similar caveats). Other researchers have pointed out promising similarities between Plateau Penutian and the Maiduan family, although this proposal is still not completely demonstrated.  A connection with Uto-Aztecan has also been suggested (Rude 2000).

The coherence of Plateau Penutian is also supposed in an automated computational analysis (ASJP 4) by Müller et al. (2013). The analysis also found Algic lexical influence on the Plateau Penutian languages.

References

Bibliography
Campbell, Lyle. (1997). American Indian languages: The historical linguistics of Native America. New York: Oxford University Press. .
Campbell, Lyle; & Mithun, Marianne (Eds.). (1979). The languages of native America: Historical and comparative assessment. Austin: University of Texas Press.
DeLancey, Scott; & Golla, Victor. (1997). The Penutian hypothesis: Retrospect and prospect. International Journal of American Linguistics, 63, 171-202.
Goddard, Ives (Ed.). (1996). Languages. Handbook of North American Indians (W. C. Sturtevant, General Ed.) (Vol. 17). Washington, D. C.: Smithsonian Institution. .
Goddard, Ives. (1999). Native languages and language families of North America (rev. and enlarged ed. with additions and corrections). [Map]. Lincoln, NE: University of Nebraska Press (Smithsonian Institution). (Updated version of the map in Goddard 1996). .
Mithun, Marianne. (1999). The languages of Native North America. Cambridge: Cambridge University Press.  (hbk); .
Rude, Noel. (1987). "Some Sahaptian-Klamath grammatical correspondences."  Kansas Working Papers in Linguistics, 12:67-83.
Rude, Noel. (2000). Some Uto-Aztecan-Plateau Grammatical Comparisons.  In Uto-Aztecan: Structural, Temporal, and Geographic Perspectives: Papers in Memory of Wick R. Miller by the Friends of Uto-Aztecan, edited by Eugene H. Casad and Thomas L. Willet, pp. 309–318.  Hermosillo, Sonora, México: Editorial UniSon.
Sapir, Edward. (1929). Central and North American languages. In The encyclopædia britannica: A new survey of universal knowledge (14 ed.) (Vol. 5, pp. 138–141). London: The Encyclopædia Britannica Company, Ltd.

 

Indigenous languages of California
Indigenous languages of the North American Plateau
Indigenous languages of North America
Proposed language families